Nýrsko is a town in Klatovy District in the Plzeň Region of the Czech Republic. It has about 4,800 inhabitants.

Administrative parts
Town parts and villages of Blata, Bystřice nad Úhlavou, Hodousice, Stará Lhota, Starý Láz and Zelená Lhota are administrative parts of Nýrsko. Zelená Lhota forms an exclave of the municipal territory.

Geography
Most of the municipal territory lies in the Bohemian Forest Foothills, but the southern part and the exclave lie in the Bohemian Forest. The Úhlava River flows through the town.

A small part of the Nýrsko Reservoir is located in the municipal territory. It serves as a source of drinking water for the region.

History
The first written mention of Nýrsko is from 1327. The settlement was probably founded in the 12th century. It was situated on the trade route to Bavaria near the ford across the Úhlava. A custom house was located here.

The lower part of the town called Dolní Nýrsko ("Lower Nýrsko") was a member of the Royal Chamber, and the upper part, Horní Nýrsko ("Upper Nýrsko"), was a market village under the ownership of the Pajrek Castle. In 1558 Horní Nýrsko joined Dolní Nýrsko and both became property of the municipality of Bystřice nad Úhlavou. The town developed and grew quickly at that time, and it obtained many rights and privileges from Rudolf II in 1593.

The development continued in the 19th century when the town was industrialized. There were match and linen factories, a tannery, a steam saw, two mills and a glass grinder. The turning point was primarily the start of production of optical products in 1895.

Demographics

Economy
The town is known by OKULA Nýrsko, which was a major manufacturer of spectacle optics and mechanics. The production started here already in 1895, when the company was moved from Vienna. Nowadays, the company is still an important regional employer, but the production specializes mainly in plastics production.

Transport
Nýřany is located on the railway line Prague–Plzeň–Železná Ruda and thus has a direct connection to the capital.

Sights

The main landmark of the town is the Church of Saint Thomas the Apostle. It was first mentioned in 1352 and it is the oldest building in Nýrsko. This Gothic church was extended in the second half of the 14th century, then early Baroque modification were made in the 17th century and further Baroque modifications in the 18th century.

In Bystřice nad Úhlavou is the Bystřice nad Úhlavou Castle. A fortress in the area existed in 1339 at the latest. In 1444, it was rebuilt in the Gothic style and extended into a castle. Renaissance modifications were made at the turn of the 16th and 17th centuries. The building acquired its current appearance during the reconstruction by its owner Count Hohenzollern-Sigmaringen in 1848–1853, mostly in the pseudo-Romanesque and pseudo-Gothic styles. Thanks to this unusual combination of styles, the castle is not artistically valuable.

Pajrek Castle is a castle ruin located on a hill south of the town. The castle was founded at the beginning of the 14th century. From the mid-16th century it was permanently abandoned. The preserved remains of the palace walls and the tower are freely accessible.

Notable people
Jan Hošek (born 1989), footballer

Gallery

References

External links

Associations and church in Nýrsko

 
Cities and towns in the Czech Republic
Populated places in Klatovy District